Madeleine Ruth Ogilvie (born 25 January 1969) is an Australian lawyer and politician. She is a Liberal Party member of the Tasmanian House of Assembly representing the Division of Clark and is the Minister for Small Business, Advanced Manufacturing and Defence Industries, Science and Technology, Racing and Heritage in the Rockliff ministry. She was previously the Minister for Hospitality, Racing, Small Business, Women and Disability Services in the Second Gutwein Ministry for six weeks.

Ogilve was previously a Labor Party member representing the Division of Denison (the predecessor of Clark) between 2014 and 2018, when she was defeated at the 2018 state election. She re-entered parliament as an independent member representing Clark in September 2019 after a recount, and then joined the Liberal Party to contest the 2021 state election.

Early life and education
Ogilvie grew up in Lenah Valley, Tasmania. She was educated at The Friends' School, Hobart College and the University of Melbourne, where she resided at Ormond College and graduated with a Bachelor of Arts in Classical Studies. She later obtained a Bachelor of Laws from the University of Tasmania, and a Graduate Certificate in Business from the Australian Graduate School of Management.

Legal career
Ogilvie was admitted as a barrister and solicitor in 1994. She was a lawyer at the Insurance and Superannuation Commission, Allens and CSIRO.

She then worked for UNESCO in France on international cultural heritage law, Indonesia on telecommunications infrastructure projects, and the United States of America, in Silicon Valley. She was later General Manager Commercial and Contracts with Telstra Corporation responsible for some of Australia's largest telecommunications deals. Ogilvie returned to Hobart, Tasmania to raise her family.

In 2006, she established a legal practice in Hobart, Ogilvie and Associates. Ogilvie is known for her advocacy of refugee rights.

Political career 
Ogilvie first stood for election to the Tasmanian House of Assembly in the 2010 state election. She received 522 first preference votes, but was not elected.

She was elected at the March 2014 election, receiving 2,156 votes and being the fifth of five candidates elected for the Denison division under the state's Hare-Clark system. Ogilvie was the only new Labor member elected in an election that saw the Labor Party lose government and several seats.

Following the 2014 election, Ogilvie was appointed Shadow Minister for Corrections, Aboriginal Affairs, Small Business, Information Technology and Innovation, and Multicultural Affairs, as well as being appointed Opposition Whip.

Ogilvie briefly made local headlines in December 2015 after voting, in a free vote, against a Tasmanian Greens party motion supporting marriage equality on the basis that it is a federal legislative reform, and in particular her online reaction to the Left faction of the Tasmanian Labor Party drawing a chalk rainbow and writing critical messages outside her electorate office. Members of the Left called for Ogilvie to be expelled from the party for not supporting the Greens' motion.

Ogilvie again came under fire from Labor's Left faction at the Party's 2017 State Conference when she voted against a bill to allow euthanasia in Tasmania. Labor leader Rebecca White allowed a conscience vote, as the motion was put forward as a private member's bill.

Ogilvie is a passionate advocate against pokies and revenge porn. Her stance on pokies was later adopted by the Party. She has also advocated for statewide discussion on Aboriginal treaty rights.

At the 2018 state election, Ogilve attempted to seek re-election to the Division of Denison but was not elected. After Scott Bacon resigned, in March 2019, Ogilve returned to the House of Assembly as an independent, representing the Division of Clark (renamed from Denison). Shortly after the 2021 state election was called, she joined the Liberal Party and ran for re-election in Clark. She was narrowly elected to the fifth and last seat of Clark after 11 days of counting and beating Liberal-turned-independent and speaker Sue Hickey to the position. Her win allowed the Liberals to cling to a one-seat majority. On 28 February 2022, she was appointed as Minister for Hospitality and Events, Minister for Racing, Minister for Small Business, Minister for Women and Minister for Disability Services, taking over from Jane Howlett who resigned earlier that week.

Six weeks later, on 12 April 2022, she was appointed as Minister for Small Business, Minister for Advanced Manufacturing and Defence Industries, Minister for Science and Technology, Minister for Racing and Minister for Heritage, after Jeremy Rockliff succeeded Peter Gutwein as Premier.

Personal life
Ogilvie is the granddaughter of former Member of the House of Assembly Eric Ogilvie, great-niece of former Premier of Tasmania Albert Ogilvie and stepdaughter of former Governor of Tasmania Peter Underwood. She is married to William Doyle, with four children.

References

1969 births
Australian Labor Party members of the Parliament of Tasmania
Independent members of the Parliament of Tasmania
Liberal Party of Australia members of the Parliament of Tasmania
Australian solicitors
Women members of the Tasmanian House of Assembly
Living people
Members of the Tasmanian House of Assembly
University of Melbourne alumni
University of Tasmania alumni
21st-century Australian politicians
21st-century Australian women politicians